The men's 5000 metres relay competition of the Short track speed skating at the 2015 Winter Universiade was held at the Universiade Igloo, Granada the qualification was held on February 11, semifinal was held on February 12 and final was held on February 13.

Results

Heats
 Q — qualified for Semifinals
 QT- qualified by time
 ADV — advanced
 PEN — penalty

Semifinals
 QA — qualified for Final A
 QB - qualified for Final B
 ADV — advanced
 PEN — penalty

Final B (classification round)

Final A (medal round)

Men's relay